Timothy Jon Gemmill (born May 28, 1949) is an American jazz musician, composer, arranger, producer, bandleader, graphic designer and entrepreneur, who has been involved in musical projects since the late 1960s. Most notably; Music Projection Trio (1970–1972), Rorschach (1973–1977), Cozzetti & Gemmill Quartet (1978–1982), Cozzetti & Gemmill (1983–present), Rocka Records (1994–2004), Rocka.com (1999–2004) and Cozgem Records (1981–present).

Discography
 1981: Cozzetti & Gemmill, Concerto For Padré (Cozgem Records)
 1984: Cozzetti & Gemmill, Soft Flower in Spring (ITI Records)
 1994:  Cozzetti & Gemmill,Timeless (Rocka Records)
 2010: Cozzetti & Gemmill, Timeless (Cozgem Records)
 2011: Voyage of the Mummy (Cozgem Records)
 2013: Road Songs (Cozgem Records)
 2017: Road Songs 2 (Cozgem Records)

References

1949 births
Living people
Jazz musicians from Washington (state)
Musicians from Seattle
American jazz saxophonists
20th-century American male musicians
20th-century American saxophonists
21st-century American male musicians
21st-century American saxophonists